Clanculus clanguloides, common name the secret clanculus, is a species of sea snail, a marine gastropod mollusk in the family Trochidae, the top snails.

Description
The height of the shell varies between 10 mm and 12 mm, its diameter between 12 mm and 15 mm. The very solid, deeply, narrowly false-umbilicate shell has a globose-conic shape. It is fawn colored, lighter beneath and roseate at the apex. The shell is sharply granose-lirate, usually with every second rib articulated with dots of white or black or both. It contains about 6 whorls. The upper ones are nearly fiat, the penultimate and last convex, the former with 7 or 8 spiral distinctly granose lirae, the last with about 18, of which the 7th usually is upon the periphery. The intersticesare finely obliquely striate. The body whorl is deflected anteriorly, and rounded at the periphery. The; base of the shell is somewhat convex. The oblique aperture is small and contracted. The outer lip bears within a strong tooth above, and an inconspicuous rather acute thread at the place of the periphery. The basal lip is expanded, curved and slightly denticulate. The columella is very oblique, slightly tortuous above and enters very deeply, terminating below in a strong plicate tooth, and with a smooth margin, save for a small denticle immediately above the basal tooth. The parietal tract is wrinkled. The umbilicus has a plicate-denticulate border.

In the typical form, the 1st, 3d, 5th, 7th and 9th lirae, and one or two upon the base are articulated with black.

Distribution
This marine species occurs in the Central and East Indian Ocean; off East Africa, East India, Indo-China, Indo-Malaysia, and Oceania; in the tropical Indo-West Pacific and off Queensland, Australia.

References

 Wood, W. 1828. Index Testaceologicus; or A Catalogue of Shells, British and Foreign, arranged according to the Linnean system. London : Taylor Supplement, 1–59, pls 1–8.
 Philippi, R.A. 1845. Abbildungen und Beschriebungen neuer oder wenig gekannter Conchylien. Cassel : Theodor Fischer 40 pp.
 Angas, G.F. 1867. A list of species of marine Mollusca found in Port Jackson harbour, New South Wales and on the adjacent coasts, with notes on their habits etc. Proceedings of the Zoological Society of London 1867: 185–233, 912–935
 Fischer, R.H. 1878. Catalogue des Mollusques appartement aux genres Turbo, Calcar et Trochus, recueilles dans les mers de l'Archipel Calédonien (supplément), suivi de la liste des espèces des genres Delphinula, Liotia et Phasianella. Journal de Conchyliologie 26: 205–211
 Fischer, P. 1879. Genres Calcar, Trochus, Xenophora, Tectarius et Risella. 337–463, 120 pls in Keiner, L.C. (ed.). Spécies general et iconographie des coquilles vivantes. Paris : J.B. Baillière Vol. 3. 
 Hedley, C. 1918. A checklist of the marine fauna of New South Wales. Part 1. Journal and Proceedings of the Royal Society of New South Wales 51: M1-M120
 Satyamurti, S.T. 1952. Mollusca of Krusadai Is. I. Amphineura and Gastropoda. Bulletin of the Madras Government Museum, Natural History ns 1(no. 2, pt 6): 267 pp., 34 pls
 Hinton, A.G. 1978. Guide to Australian Shells. Port Moresby : Robert Brown & Associates 82 pp.
 Rajagopal, A.S. & Mookherjee, H.P. 1978. Contributions to the molluscan fauna of India. Pt. I. Marine molluscs of the Coromandel Coast, Palk Strait and Gulf of Mannar – Gastropoda: Archaeogastropoda. Records of the Zoological Survey of India 12: 1–48
 Kay, E.A. 1979. Hawaiian Marine Shells. Reef and shore fauna of Hawaii. Section 4 : Mollusca. Honolulu, Hawaii : Bishop Museum Press Bernice P. Bishop Museum Special Publication Vol. 64(4) 653 pp
 Wilson B. (1993) Australian marine shells. Prosobranch gastropods. Vol. 1. Odyssey Publishing, Kallaroo, Western Australia, 408 pp
 Jansen, P. 1995. A review of the genus Clanculus Montfort, 1810 (Gastropoda: Trochidae) in Australia, with description of a new subspecies and the introduction of a nomen novum. Vita Marina 43(1–2): 39–62

External links
 

clanguloides
Gastropods described in 1828